Sahar Youssef (born 1 December 1968) is a former synchronized swimmer from Egypt. She competed in the women's solo and women's duet at the 1984 Summer Olympics.

References 

1968 births
Living people
Egyptian synchronized swimmers
Olympic synchronized swimmers of Egypt
Synchronized swimmers at the 1984 Summer Olympics